The  is a kei car built by the Japanese manufacturer Daihatsu since 2015. It comes in three variations designated "Style", "Activa" and "Sport". Each can be equipped with either front- or four-wheel drive configuration.

Overview 
A continuously variable transmission is fitted on all models and the Sport variant is sold with a 7-speed paddle-shifted mode.

The Activa and Sport variants (as well as the Pixis Joy C and S) were discontinued in March 2020, leaving only the Style variant. Both variants were replaced by the more rugged SUV-styled LA900 series Taft.

Gallery 
Cast

Pixis Joy

References

External links 

  (Cast)
  (Pixis Joy)

Cast
Cars introduced in 2015
2020s cars
Kei cars
Hatchbacks
Front-wheel-drive vehicles
All-wheel-drive vehicles
Vehicles with CVT transmission